Greenwich Power Station is a standby gas and formerly oil and coal-fired power station by the River Thames at Greenwich in south-east London. Originally constructed to supply power for London's tram system, since 1988 it has been London Underground's central emergency power supply, providing power if there is partial or total loss of National Grid supplies.

History
The power station was constructed on the riverside site of a former tram depot operated by the London Tramways Company (and before that by the Pimlico Peckham & Greenwich Street Tramway Company, taken over in 1873). An Act of Parliament, The London County Council (Tramways and Improvement) Act 1902, empowered London County Council to construct new tramways, improve existing ones and to "erect maintain and use a station for generating and transforming electrical energy with all necessary engines dynamos plant and machinery."

The station was designed by William Edward Riley, chief architect of the LCC architects department, and built in two sections between 1902 and 1910, to provide power for London County Council Tramways. The first section was formally opened on 26 May 1906 by Sir Evan Spicer, chairman of the county council. Surplus power was used by other electric tramways and the Underground Electric Railways Company of London. The station originally had a coal-fired boiler house, fuelled by coal craned from barges on the River Thames, and an engine room. This housed four compound reciprocating steam engines driving flywheel-type alternators with an output of 6,600 volts at 25 Hz.

The station is an early London example of a steel-framed building with a stone-clad brick cover. It is divided into two naves: the west nave, originally the boiler house, is now the turbine hall; the east nave, now largely unused, was the former engine room. The external stock brick walls include Portland stone decorations, notably on the south and north elevations. Corrugated sheeting replaced the original slate roof. The coaling pier was designed by the LCC's chief engineer, Maurice Fitzmaurice.

By 1910 the advantages of steam turbines were well known and four steam turbine alternators were installed in the second stage of the station's building programme. The reciprocating engines installed during the first stage were replaced by steam turbines in 1922.

The taller chimneys were eventually reduced to the height of the later chimneys during a modernisation programme between 1969 and 1972.

The steam turbines were replaced by Rolls-Royce gas turbine generators. These originally burned oil, but were later converted to burn oil and gas. The generators are still housed in what was formerly the boiler house. They have a total capacity of 117.6 megawatts (MW), generated at 11,000 volts. This voltage can be increased to 22,000 volts for connection to the London Underground electricity system. The gas turbines were originally introduced to supplement output from London Underground's west London power station at Lots Road. When LU began to use National Grid power supplies in 1998 and Lots Road was subsequently decommissioned, Greenwich became LU's central emergency power supply and London's only original power station still in operation. Its six engines provide power if there is partial or total loss of National Grid supplies, enabling safe evacuation of passengers and staff from London's underground network.

In 2015, TfL instigated a 20-year programme to install up to six new gas engines in Greenwich Power Station's Old Turbine Hall. They were envisaged as providing a steady source of reliable, low carbon power for the Tube as well as hot water and heating for nearby schools and homes. However, after local objections about increased air pollution, the proposal was withdrawn in December 2016 ‘to allow time for a review of the project to ensure it aligns with the priorities of the new Mayoral administration’. (During 2016, a combined heat and power (CHP) energy centre had been constructed on a nearby Greenwich Peninsula site to provide district heating to an eventual total of 15,700 properties.)

Operations 
Coal was delivered by barge to the large coal jetty in the river, which stands on 16 Doric-styled, cast iron columns. From 1927, the coal was then conveyed to then white-painted storage bunkers constructed on the west side of the station (following remedial work in 2013, the bunkers were coloured black). After the transition to oil-fired operation, its cranes (previously also used for coal ash removal) were removed and the jetty was modified to allow fuel oil to be pumped ashore from river tankers. However, the pier is now disused as any oil used at the station comes by road tanker.

In 2020, the turbines were switched on once per month on average for up to two hours, and TfL was reviewing the power station's future as emergency back-up power provider. In January 2021, a gas turbine generator contained in a unit on the ground floor was destroyed by fire.

In popular culture
Greenwich Power Station was a location used to accompany the track "Heartland" in Infected: The Movie, a 1986 music video collection featuring The The.

Almost 20 years later, the power station appeared in the music video for "The Importance of Being Idle", a song by the English rock band Oasis which reached number one in the UK charts in 2005.

Notes and references

Buildings and structures in the Royal Borough of Greenwich
Coal-fired power stations in England
Former power stations in London
London Underground infrastructure
Natural gas-fired power stations in England
Oil-fired power stations in England
Port of London
Power stations in London
Power stations on the River Thames